Kala Viplavam Pranayam (English: Art Revolution Romance) is a 2018 Indian Malayalam-language drama film directed by debutant Jithin Jithu and produced by Roy Sebastian. The film stars Anson Paul and Gayathri Suresh in the lead roles.

Cast

Parvathi T, Bijukuttan, Shobha Mohan, and Mahesh appear in cameo roles.

Production
The shoot for Kala Viplavam Pranayam commenced on 14 August 2017 in Thiruvananthapuram. The narrative of Kala Viplavam Pranayam is three-layered and revolves around art, romance and revolution. Reportedly, Anson Paul plays the protagonist in the movie and would be seen romancing Gayathri Suresh who plays a bold lecturer with communist leanings.

During the shoot days of Kala Viplavam Pranayam the writer Aashiq Akbar Ali had received enough and more phone calls only because of a picture which depicts a Muslim girl wearing a burqa on the location holding a party flag. However, the team did not let that affect the characterizations of the story.

References

External links
 
 

2018 films
2018 directorial debut films
2010s Malayalam-language films
Indian drama films
Films shot in Thiruvananthapuram
2018 drama films